BPHS or bphs may refer to:
 Bṛhat Parāśara Horāśāstra, a foundational compilation of Indian astrology
 Bands per haploid set, number of bands seen in a haploid set in cytogenetics

Schools 
 Baldwin Park High School, Baldwin Park, California, United States
 Banksia Park International High School, Adelaide, South Australia, Australia
 Bethel Park High School, Bethel Park, Pennsylvania, United States
 Bossley Park High School, Bossley Park, New South Wales, Australia
 Brooke Point High School, Stafford, Virginia, United States
 Buena Park High School, Orange County, California, United States